In Ian Fleming's James Bond novels and the derived films, the 00 Section of MI6 is considered the secret service's elite. A 00 (typically read "double O" and denoted in Fleming's novels by the letters OO rather than the digits 00) is a field agent who holds a licence to kill in the field, at their discretion, to complete any mission. The novel Moonraker establishes that the section routinely has three agents concurrently; the film series, in Thunderball, establishes a minimum number of nine 00 agents active at that time.

Inspiration
The origins of the Double O title may date to Fleming's wartime service. According to World War II historian Damien Lewis in his book Churchill's Secret Warriors, agents of the Special Operations Executive (SOE) were given a "0" prefix when they became "zero-rated" upon completion of training in how to kill. As part of his role as assistant to the head of naval intelligence, Rear Admiral John Godfrey (himself the inspiration for M), Fleming acted as liaison to the SOE.

Description
In the first novel, Casino Royale, and the 2006 film adaptation, the 00 concept is introduced and, in Bond's words, means "that you've had to kill a chap in cold blood in the course of some assignment". Bond's 00 number (007) was awarded to him because he twice killed in fulfilling assignments. (This differentiates from deadly force used by non-00 agents in the course of self-defence or offensive action; plus, in the original time frame of the novel—the early 1950s—many MI6 agents would have had recent war service.) In the second novel, Live and Let Die, the 00 number designates a past killing; not until the third novel, Moonraker, does the 00 number designate a licence to kill. Thereafter, the novels are ambiguous about whether a 00 agent's licence to kill is limited, with varying accounts in Dr. No, Goldfinger, and The Man with the Golden Gun.

Per Fleming's Moonraker, 00 agents face mandatory retirement at 45; John Gardner contradicts this in his novels, depicting a fifty-odd-year-old secret agent. Sebastian Faulks's Devil May Care features M giving Bond a choice of when to retire.

Fleming himself only mentions five 00 agents in all. According to Moonraker, James Bond is the most senior of three 00 agents; the two others were 008 and 0011. The three men share an office and a secretary named Loelia Ponsonby. Later novels feature two more 00 agents; 009 is mentioned in Thunderball and 006 is mentioned in On Her Majesty's Secret Service. Other authors have elaborated and expanded upon the 00 agents. While they presumably have been sent on dangerous missions as Bond has, little has been revealed about most of them. Several have been named, both by Fleming and other authors, along with passing references to their service records, which suggest that agents are largely recruited (as Bond was) from the British military's special forces.

In the films, the 00 section is a discrete area of MI6, whose agents report directly to M, and tend to be sent on special assignments and troubleshooting missions, often involving rogue agents (from Britain or other countries) or situations where an "ordinary" intelligence operation uncovers or reveals terrorist or criminal activity too sensitive to be dealt with using ordinary procedural or legal measures, and where the aforementioned discretionary "licence to kill" is deemed necessary or useful in rectifying the situation. The World Is Not Enough introduces a special insignia for the 00 Section. Bond's fellow 00 agents appear receiving briefings in Thunderball and The World Is Not Enough. The latter film shows a woman in one of the 00 chairs. In Thunderball, there are nine chairs for the 00 agents; Moneypenny says every 00 agent in Europe has been recalled, not every 00 agent in the world. Behind the scenes photos of the film reveal that one of the agents in the chairs is female as well. As with the books, other writers have elaborated and expanded upon the 00 agents in the films and in other media. In GoldenEye, 006 is an alias for Alec Trevelyan, while in No Time to Die the 007 codename is assigned to Nomi after Bond's retirement from MI6. As of 2021, Trevelyan and Nomi are the only 00 agents other than Bond to play a major role in an EON Productions film, with all other appearances either being brief or dialogue references only.

List of 00s
The following lists are of the known 00 agents of the British Secret Service who exist in the Ian Fleming novels and short stories, the officially licensed novels, the EON movies, or in the official video games or comic strips.

00 Agents from Ian Fleming's Bond stories

00 Agents from Bond stories by other authors

00 Agents from the Eon film franchise

00 Agents from computer and video games

00 Agents from other official media

False 00 Agents from Casino Royale (1967)

The 1967 film adaptation of Fleming's first novel, Casino Royale, spoofed the EON film series. As part of its storyline, Sir James Bond (David Niven), after having assumed the position of M, mandates that all MI6 agents – male and female – be renamed James Bond 007 in order to confuse enemy agents of SMERSH.

See also
List of James Bond parodies and spin-offs

References

James Bond characters
Fictional British secret agents
Fictional intelligence agencies